Delgovicia or Delgovitia was a Romano-British town in Britain, mentioned by the Antonine Itinerary as being east of Eboracum (Roman York). It is also mentioned by the Geographer of Ravenna as Devovicia or Devovitia. Its location is currently unknown. Several scholars have postulated various identifications for Delgovicia:
William Smith suggested it was probably Market Weighton.
Benjamin Pitts Capper suggested it was Londesborough.
A. L. F. Rivet & Colin Smith suggest it was probably Wetwang.
Others suggest the ruins at Millington.

References

Lost ancient cities and towns
Roman towns and cities in England
History of the East Riding of Yorkshire